Abas-Abad may refer to:
 Abbasabad, Azerbaijan
 Asadabad, Yardymli, Azerbaijan